Pat Savage is a footballer.

Pat Savage may also refer to:

Pat Savage (rugby league)
Pat Savage (Doc Savage character)

See also
Patrick Savage (disambiguation)